William Pitt (8 June 1800 – 9 December 1871) was an English first-class cricketer who played for Marylebone Cricket Club sides in two matches in 1822, totalling 8 runs with a highest score of 4.

References

English cricketers
English cricketers of 1787 to 1825
1800 births
1871 deaths
Marylebone Cricket Club Second 10 with 1 Other cricketers
Marylebone Cricket Club Second 9 with 3 Others cricketers